The Man in a Hurry is a 1941 novel by the French writer Paul Morand. It tells the story of a busy Paris antiques dealer who does not seem to be able to relax and settle down, not even when he finally falls in love, gets married and has a child. According to Morand, the main character is largely autobiographical. An English translation by Euan Cameron was published by Pushkin Press in 2015.

Reception
Bill Spence of The Press wrote in 2015: "This novel is a joy to read and has been superbly translated for the first time in English. Euan Cameron brings out the true flavour of French literature. It is an unusual, witty book that is so apt for our way of life in a technological age." Kirkus Reviews wrote the same year: "The translation's prose is refined and worldly, the atmosphere European, the overall effect that of a jeu d'esprit. Where the book rises above that is in the depiction of the minimatriarchy Pierre marries into. The four women's curious behavior recalls moments in Mervyn Peake's Gormenghast novels and Eugenides' Virgin Suicides."

Film adaptations
The book has been the basis for two film adaptations. Édouard Molinaro's The Hurried Man, starring Alain Delon, premiered in 1977. It recorded admissions of 730,581 in France.

A television film directed by Sébastien Grall, also titled The Hurried Man, was released in 2005.

References

External links
 The Man in a Hurry at the French publisher's website 
 The Man in a Hurry at the British publisher's website

1941 French novels
French novels adapted into films
French-language novels
Novels by Paul Morand
Novels set in Paris